Chicobolus spinigerus, commonly known as the ivory millipede or Florida ivory millipede, is a millipede species native to the southeastern United States, occurring throughout the Florida Peninsula and Panhandle, as well as southern Alabama, Georgia, and South Carolina.

References

Millipedes of North America
Spirobolida
Animals described in 1864
Fauna of the Southeastern United States